Seaside Communications is a Canadian cable television and telecommunications company. In 1975, Seaside was established in Sydney, Nova Scotia, when it was issued a cable licence from the CRTC. On August 23rd, 2021 Rogers Communications purchased Seaside Communications for an undiscolsed amount.

Products 
Digital, high-definition television and analog television, high speed internet, home phone.

Service areas 
Glace Bay, Nova Scotia, New Waterford, Nova Scotia, Reserve Mines, Louisbourg, Baddeck, Nova Scotia, St. Peter's, Nova Scotia and surrounding communities such as Albert Bridge, Hornes Road, Hillside, Hills Road, Marion Bridge, Carabin's Trailer Park, Main-à-Dieu, Neal Cove, Bateston, Catalone and Catalone Road. Seaside signed a partnership agreement on July 6th, 2020 with Eskasoni Communications to provide fiber optic service in Eskasoni First Nation.

Company history

 1975 Seaside Cable TV Ltd. 
 1984 Seaside Cable TV (1984) Ltd. (Ownership Change) 1988 Seaside expands to the communities of Albert Bridge, Hornes Road, Hillside, Hills Road, Marion Bridge, Carabin's Trailer Park, Main-à-Dieu, Neal Cove, Bateston, Catalone and Catalone Road.
 1991 Seaside acquires River Bourgeois Cablevision Limited.
 1992 Seaside acquires Baddeck Cable T.V. Company Ltd.
 1992 Seaside acquires St. Peter's Cablevision Limited.
 2000 Seaside Communications Inc. (Name Change)
 2006 Seaside adds Video on demand (VOD) services to its lineup.
 2020 Seaside partners with Eskasoni Communications to provide service in the community.
 2021 Rogers Communications acquires Seaside.

References

External links
 Seaside Communications
 Seaside Wireless High Speed

Cable and DBS companies of Canada
Telecommunications companies of Canada
Internet service providers of Canada
Companies based in the Cape Breton Regional Municipality
Telecommunications companies established in 1975
1975 establishments in Nova Scotia